Arundina graminifolia is a species of orchid and the sole accepted species of the genus Arundina. This tropical Asiatic genus extends from Myanmar, India, Sri Lanka, Nepal, Thailand, Vietnam, the Ryukyu Islands, Malaysia, Singapore, China to Indonesia, the Philippines and New Guinea. It has become naturalized in Réunion, Fiji, French Polynesia, Micronesia, the West Indies, Costa Rica, Panama, Belize, and Hawaii.
It is also called bamboo orchid.

Description

Arundina graminifolia is a terrestrial, perennial orchid with reedy stems, forming into large clumps growing to a height between 70 cm and  2 m.

The plaited linear leaves are oblong lanceolate, with a length of 9 to 19 cm and a width of 0.8 to 1.5 cm. The apex is acuminate. There are amplexicaul (clasping the stem) sheathing stipules.

This orchid blooms in summer and autumn, showing rather open clusters of showy terminal flowers, ten at the most. They bloom in succession on the terminal racemes,which are 7 to 16 cm long. These flowers, 5–8 cm in diameter, are a rosy lilac and white disc with a purple lip. The bracts are broadly triangular and surround the main stalk of the flower cluster. The occasional fertilized seed pods contain minute powdery seeds, and small plants often develop near the cane ends after flowering, which likely aid in propagation if allowed to reach the soil.

At one point in time only 200 of the plants were recorded growing naturally in Singapore, rendering the species close to extinction. This was due to the destruction of its natural habitat, namely the rainforests and mangrove forests. However, through replanting efforts by NParks, the species is now listed as a "common" cultivated plant. In Malaysia A. graminifolia is commonly called tapah and can be found in secondary forests or at forest fringes.  It is very common in road cuts and other disturbed areas in full sun in Sarawak, where it is often the most common flowering plant seen along the roadsides. 
It is invasive on the big island of Hawaii and common there in mid-mountain areas.

Varieties
Two varieties are currently recognized (May 2014):

Arundina graminifolia var. graminifolia
Arundina graminifolia var. revoluta (Hook.f.) A.L.Lamb in C.L.Chan. & al. - from Assam and Sri Lanka east to Vietnam and south to Java

Gallery

References

External links 

Dave's Garden, Bamboo Orchid, Bird Orchid, Grass-Like Leaf Arundina, Arundina graminifolia 
Orchid Care Tips Arundina graminifolia
IOSPE orchid photos Arundina graminifolia
Neotropical Savannah (in Panama), Bamboo Orchid, Arundina graminifolia
Gardino Nursery (Del Ray Beach Florida USA), Rare and Unusual Plants, bamboo orchid, Arundina graminifolia

Arethusinae
Monotypic Epidendroideae genera
Arethuseae genera
Orchids of Asia
Orchids of Malaya
Orchids of Indonesia
Orchids of Malaysia
Orchids of China
Orchids of India
Orchids of New Guinea
Orchids of Thailand
Orchids of Vietnam
Orchids of Bangladesh
Orchids of the Philippines
Orchids of Singapore
Orchids of Nepal
Flora of the Ryukyu Islands